Jure Bogataj (born 26 April 1985) is a Slovenian former ski jumper who competed from 2002 to 2011. He won a bronze medal in the team normal hill event at the 2005 FIS Nordic World Ski Championships in Oberstdorf and finished 28th in the individual large hill at those same championships.

External links

1985 births
Living people
Slovenian male ski jumpers
FIS Nordic World Ski Championships medalists in ski jumping
Sportspeople from Kranj